Kill Bill Vol. 2 Original Soundtrack is the soundtrack to the second volume of the two-part Quentin Tarantino film, Kill Bill. First released on April 13, 2004, it reached #58 on the Billboard 200 and #2 on the Billboard soundtracks chart in the US. It also reached the ARIA Top 50 album charts in Australia. It was orchestrated by Tarantino's fellow filmmaker and personal friend Robert Rodriguez, as well as RZA from the Wu-Tang Clan.

Development
Robert Rodriguez was hired by Tarantino to score the film. Rodriguez did it as a favour for his friend, Tarantino, asking to be paid one dollar for his work. Tarantino repaid this favour by directing a scene of Rodriguez's Sin City for the same fee. RZA said of the soundtrack: 
"With Kill Bill I did score and songs, meaning that we put a lot of songs in [the movie] from old collections of records and I composed music for some scenes, natural music. When we did Kill Bill 2, you know, we brought Robert Rodriguez in. Check this out, he took my music and he kept the foundation there, though. With Robert he didn't want to remove any of the electronic [sounds]. He said 'No.' I was like 'Take out all the electronic stuff, you know, so it can be [more like a traditional score].' He said 'No, man. I like the electronic stuff. This is the reason I wanted to do this.' So he took the electronic stuff and kept it there, then built the orchestrations on top of it, you know what I mean?"

Track listing
 "A Few Words from the Bride" by Uma Thurman – 0:42
 "Goodnight Moon" by Shivaree – 4:03
 "Il tramonto" by Ennio Morricone – 1:15
 "Can't Hardly Stand It" by Charlie Feathers – 2:48
 "Tu Mirá" (edit) by Lole y Manuel – 4:00
 "Summertime Killer" by Luis Bacalov – 3:39
 "The Chase" by Alan Reeves, Phil Steele, and Philip Brigham – 1:03
 "The Legend of Pai Mei" by David Carradine and Uma Thurman – 2:06
 "L'arena" by Ennio Morricone – 4:46
 "A Satisfied Mind" by Johnny Cash – 2:50
 "A Silhouette of Doom" by Ennio Morricone – 2:54
 "About Her" by Malcolm McLaren – 4:49
 "Truly and Utterly Bill" by David Carradine and Uma Thurman – 0:47
 "Malagueña Salerosa" by Chingon – 4:05
 "Urami Bushi" by Meiko Kaji – 3:33
Hidden Track: "Black Mamba" by The Wu-Tang Clan – 2:38 (Appears at the end of Urami Bushi, after a lengthy period of silence.)

Song notes
"About Her" by Malcolm McLaren sampled vocals from The Zombies's song "She's Not There"
and Bessie Smith's song "St. Louis Blues" from the movie of the same name.

Not included
Numerous noteworthy tracks used in the film and to advertise it were not included in the soundtrack album:

 Nora Orlandi's "Dies Irae" — used in the conversation between Bill and Budd.
 "Ay Que Caray" by Marilu Esmeralda Aguiluz — source music in the strip club.
 "Budd's Trailer Suspicions" — original, incidental music by Robert Rodriguez, heard when The Bride lurks around Budd's trailer.
 "A Fistful of Dollars (prima)" by Ennio Morricone, from A Fistful of Dollars — heard as Budd spits on the bride and injects her with tranquilizers.
 "Il mercenario (ripresa)" by Ennio Morricone, from the film The Mercenary — heard as The Bride escapes from the coffin.
 "Pai Mei Theme" — original incidental music by Robert Rodriguez; heard as The Bride ascends the stairs to Pai Mei's temple.
 "Title Theme from Three Tough Guys" by Isaac Hayes — used for the Bride/Pai Mei fight training sequence.
 "Invincible Pole Fighter" by Sho Chun Hou & Stephen Shing; used for The Bride's training montage with Pai Mei.
 "Sunny Road to Salina" performed by Christophe and composed by Bernard Girard, from the film Road to Salina — used for The Bride's march through the desert, frequently used in Kill Bill ads.
 The "Budd Twang" — original guitar piece by Robert Rodriguez, one version heard after Budd shoots the Bride, another when Elle is about to escape with the cash.
 "Bang Bang" (original song by Sonny and Cher) variation after Budd drugs the Bride, first done in a slower pace, followed by a Spaghetti Western style variation.
 "I giorni dell'ira" (Days of Anger) by Riz Ortolani — When Elle does a mid air kick toward the Bride with sound effects.
 "The Demise of Barbara and the Return of Joe" by Ennio Morricone, from Navajo Joe, used for the death of Bill.
 "Il Triello" by Ennio Morricone, from The Good, the Bad and the Ugly, used in the trailer.

See also 
 Kill Bill Vol. 1 Original Soundtrack

Certifications and sales

References

RZA albums
Kill Bill
2004 soundtrack albums
Robert Rodriguez soundtracks

fr:Kill Bill#Bande originale